Melanodexia glabricula is a species of cluster fly in the family Polleniidae.

Distribution
United States.

References

Polleniidae
Insects described in 1887
Diptera of North America